Mariachi El Bronx is the fifth studio album by the Los Angeles rock band The Bronx, released August 2, 2011 through ATO Records. It is the band's second album under their alter egos "Mariachi El Bronx", in which they play mariachi music in place of their usual hardcore punk and hard rock styles.

Reception
K. Ross Hoffman of AllMusic gave Mariachi El Bronx four and a half stars out of five, saying that "If there was any doubt that the gringo Angeleno hardcore punks in The Bronx were dead serious about their Mexican folk alter-ego ... the outfit's second album offers ironclad reassurance that this is no novelty act." He remarked that the album was a "significant improvement" over the band's 2009 mariachi album "in almost every respect: both the production and the performances are notably crisper and punchier; the arrangements are richer and more complex, full of swirling, soaring strings; the stylistic range is successfully broadened (to encompass cumbia, norteño, and bolero), and the passion and fire on display are simply undeniable. And the songs, in particular, are uniformly strong and memorable".

Track listing

Personnel 

The Bronx
 Matt Caughthran – vocals
 Joby J. Ford – vihuela, guitar, bajo sexto, accordion, jarana, recording engineer, album art
 Jorma Vik – drums, percussion
 Brad Magers – trumpet, backing vocals
 Ken Horne – jarana
 Vincent Hidalgo – guitarrón, requinto jarocho, guitar
 Ray Suen – violin, guitar, harp, requinto jarocho, vihuela, jarana, backing vocals

Additional musicians
 John Avila – charango, backing vocals
 Alfredo Ortiz – percussion
 Laura Peña – gritos, backing vocals
 Sasha Hernandez – gritos, backing vocals
 Linda Uhila – gritos, backing vocals

Production
 John Avila – producer, recording engineer
 Danny Avila – assistant recording engineer
 Beau Burchell – mixing engineer
 Gavin Lurssen – mastering
 Lisa Johnson – photographs

Artwork
 Joby J. Ford – artwork
 Lisa Johnson – photography

Charts

References 

2011 albums
The Bronx (band) albums
ATO Records albums
Albums produced by John Avila